Sociedad Deportiva Melilla was a Spanish football team based in the autonomous city of Melilla. Founded in 1970 and dissolved in 1976, it played for two consecutive seasons in Tercera División.

History
Founded in 1970, the club won promotion to Tercera División in 1974 after defeating Ceuta-based side SDU África Ceutí in the promotion play-offs. After two seasons in the third tier, the club was involved into a fusion with newly-formed side Gimnástico Melilla CF, but the move never materialize, and SD Melilla's main players moved to the latter club instead. Having no time to form a squad to play in the third division, the SD resign from their place in the category on 25 August 1976, becoming diluted inside Gimnásticos structure afterwards.

Club background
Juventud Español — (1940–43)
Melilla Fútbol Club — (1921–43)
Unión Deportiva Melilla — (1943–56)
Club Deportivo Tesorillo — (1940–56)
Melilla Club de Fútbol – (1956–76)
Club Gimnástico de Cabrerizas – (1973–76)
Sociedad Deportiva Melilla – (1970–76)
Gimnástico Melilla Club de Fútbol – (1976–80)
Unión Deportiva Melilla – (1980–)

Other clubs from Melilla
Club Deportivo Real Melilla — (1939–)
Club de Fútbol Melilla Industrial – (1968–74)
Club de Fútbol Industrial Melilla – (1975–85)
Melilla Fútbol Club — (1985–91)

Season to season

2 seasons in Tercera División

References

 
Football clubs in Melilla
Association football clubs established in 1970
Association football clubs disestablished in 1976
1970 establishments in Spain
1976 establishments in Spain